Susan Ouriou (born 15 July 1955) is a Canadian fiction writer, literary translator and editor.

Career 
Ouriou, née Muir, was born in Red Deer, Alberta and raised in Calgary, Alberta and pursued her studies in France, Spain, Quebec and Mexico, obtaining a bachelor's degree in applied foreign languages and a masters in translation studies. She has worked as a fiction writer, literary translator and editor and was one of the co-founders of the Banff International Literary Translation Centre at the Banff Centre, where she also served for three years as the BILTC's director.

Ouriou has worked as a interpreter in a variety of capacities, including with The Truth and Reconciliation Commission of Canada.

Awards
The Thirteenth Summer, her translation of José Luis Olaizola's Planicio, was a finalist for the John Glassco Translation Prize in 1994.

Pieces of Me, Ouriou's translation of Charlotte Gingras' La liberté? Connais pas, won the Governor General's Award for French to English translation at the 2009 Governor General's Awards. She has been shortlisted for the award three other times, for The Road to Chlifa (Michèle Marineau, La Route de Chlifa) at the 1995 Governor General's Awards, for Necessary Betrayals (Guillaume Vigneault, Chercher le vent) at the 2003 Governor General's Awards, and as co-translator with Christelle Morelli of Stolen Sisters: The Story of Two Missing Girls, Their Families and How Canada Has Failed Indigenous Women (Emmanuelle Walter, Sœurs volées: Enquête sur un féminicide au Canada) at the 2015 Governor General's Awards.

Ouriou and Morelli also jointly won a Libris Award in 2014 for Jane, the Fox and Me, their translation of Fanny Britt's Jane, le renard et moi.

One of her many short stories, "Violette Bicyclette" (Alberta Views, 2008) won the Western Canadian Magazines Association fiction award and her first novel Damselfish was short-listed for the Writers Guild of Alberta's Georges Bugnet Fiction Award and the City of Calgary W.O. Mitchell Book Prize. Several of her short stories have been translated into Spanish, French, Dutch and Bulgarian.

In 2010, she was appointed  a Chevalier in France's Ordre des Arts et des Lettres in recognition of her commitment to La Francophonie through her work as a writer, translator and interpreter.

Bibliography

Fiction 
 Damselfish (XYZ Publishing, 2003)
 Nathan (Red Deer Press, 2016)
 The Recipe (Loft on Eighth, 2018)
 The Stuff of Life (Short Édition, 2019)

Translation 
A selected list of Ouriou's translations include:
 1993 - The Thirteenth Summer (José Luis Olaizola, Planicio)
 1998 - The Road to Chlifa (Michèle Marineau, La Route de Chlifa)
 2002 - Necessary Betrayals (Guillaume Vigneault, Chercher le vent)
 2009 - Pieces of Me (Charlotte Gingras, La Liberté? Connais pas)
 2013 - Jane, the Fox and Me, a co-translation with Christelle Morelli (Fanny Britt, Jane, le renard et moi)
 2015 - Stolen Sisters - The Story of Two Missing Girls, Their Families and How Canada Has Failed Indigenous Women and Girls, a co-translation with Christelle Morelli (Emmanuelle Walter, Sœurs volées - Enquête sur un féminicide au Canada)
 2017 - Winter Child, a co-translation with Christelle Morelli (Virginia Pésémapéo Bordeleau, L'enfant hiver)
 2017 - Louis Undercover, a co-translation with Christelle Morelli (Fanny Britt,  Louis parmi les spectres)
 2018 - Ophelia, a co-translation with Christelle Morelli (Charlotte Gingras, Ophélie)
 2019 - The Body of the Beasts (Audrée Wilhelmy, Le Corps des bêtes)
 2019 - Blue Bear Woman, a co-translation with Christelle Morelli (Virginia Pésémapéo Bordeleau, Ourse bleue)
 2021 - The Lover, the Lake (Virginia Pésémapéo Bordeleau, L'Amant du lac)
 2022 - White Resin (Audrée Wilhelmy, Blanc Résine)

Anthologies, Editor 
 Beyond Words – Translating the World (Banff Centre Press, 2010)
 Languages of Our Land - Indigenous Poems and Stories from Quebec (Banff Centre Press, 2014)

References 

1955 births
Living people
Canadian women novelists
Canadian women short story writers
People from Red Deer, Alberta
Writers from Calgary
Governor General's Award-winning translators
Spanish–English translators
French–English translators
Chevaliers of the Ordre des Arts et des Lettres
21st-century Canadian novelists
21st-century Canadian short story writers
21st-century Canadian translators
21st-century Canadian women writers